Kinesin family member 5A is a protein that in humans is encoded by the KIF5A gene.

This gene encodes a member of the kinesin family of proteins. Members of this family are part of a multi-subunit complex that functions as a microtubule motor in intracellular organelle transport. Mutations in this gene cause autosomal dominant spastic paraplegia 10.

Interactions 

KIF5A has been shown to interact with KLC1.

Clinical significance
Mutations in KIF5A have been reported to cause hereditary spastic paraplegia type 10 (SPG1). 

Mutations in KIF5A have also been found to cause amyotrophic lateral sclerosis. 

KIF5A has been shown to play a role in Alzheimer's disease by modulating the toxic effect of beta-amyloid on axonal transport of mitochondria.

References

Further reading

External links